Noémie O'Farrell (born March 16, 1988) is a Canadian actress from Lévis, Quebec. She is most noted for her performance in the 2019 film Fabulous (Fabuleuses), for which she received a Prix Iris nomination for Best Actress at the 22nd Quebec Cinema Awards.

She has also had roles in the films Dead Leaves (Feuilles mortes) and Guilt, and the television series L'Heure bleue, En tout cas and Oh My Lord!

References

External links

21st-century Canadian actresses
Canadian film actresses
Canadian television actresses
Canadian stage actresses
Actresses from Quebec
French Quebecers
People from Lévis, Quebec
Living people
1978 births